Through the Wormhole is an American science documentary television series narrated and hosted by American actor Morgan Freeman. It began airing on Science Channel in the United States on June 9, 2010. The series concluded its run on May 16, 2017.

Development and production 
The Science Channel has been highlighting what VP of Production Bernadette McDaid calls the "Rock Stars of Science" and physics outreach such as Michio Kaku and Brian Cox. "We wanted to merge our 'Rock Stars of Science' ... with the superstars of pop culture." When Science general manager Deborah Myers heard that Morgan Freeman was very interested in things to do with the universe and space and "asks the big philosophical questions", she approached Freeman and his producer and proposed making a series together.

On February 17, 2011, Sean Carroll confirmed on his Twitter page that filming of season 2 of Through the Wormhole began. On May 17, 2011, Discovery confirmed the second season would premiere on Science on June 8, 2011. An episode from the second season was supposed to air on July 13, 2011, but went unaired. It was later released on the season 2 DVD on November 22, 2011, as the sixth episode.

On January 3, 2012, Sean Carroll posted a picture on his Twitter page, mentioning that it was taken during the taping of season 3. Season 3 began with a special episode on March 6, 2012, and the remaining nine episodes began airing on June 6, 2012.

Season 4 of Through the Wormhole began with a special episode on March 20, 2013, and the remaining nine episodes began airing on June 5, 2013.

On October 9, 2013, the Science Channel began airing enhanced episodes of the show under the title Beyond the Wormhole with Morgan Freeman.

Season 5 of Through the Wormhole began with a special episode on March 5, 2014, and the remaining nine episodes began airing on June 4, 2014.

On March 10, 2014, series producer Anthony Lund stated in an interview with the Los Angeles Post-Examiner that "Wormhole season 6 is a GO, and I'm dreaming of new, thought provoking ideas to explore with this show."

Season 6 of Through the Wormhole premiered on April 29, 2015. Season 6 consists of six episodes, unlike the previous seasons, which all have ten (except season 1, which has 8 episodes).

On March 31, 2016, Science Channel announced it would return for a seventh season, which premiered on August 30, 2016. The eighth and final season premiered on April 25, 2017.

Episodes

Series overview

Season 1 (2010)

Season 2 (2011)

Season 3 (2012)

Season 4 (2013)

Season 5 (2014)

Season 6 (2015)

Season 7 (2016)

Season 8 (2017)

DVD releases
In region 1, season 1 was released on DVD on March 8, 2011, season 2 was released on November 22, 2011, season 3 was released on October 23, 2012, season 4 was released on September 16, 2014, season 5 was released on June 16, 2015, and season 6 was released on December 15, 2016.

See also
The Universe
How the Universe Works
Killers of the Cosmos
Into the Universe with Stephen Hawking
The Fabric of the Cosmos
The Planets
The Planets and Beyond
Strip the Cosmos
Curiosity
Cosmos

References

External links 

2010s American documentary television series
2010 American television series debuts
2017 American television series endings
Documentary television series about science
Science Channel original programming
Television shows scored by Hans Zimmer